Sremska Mitrovica Airport ( / )  is an airport near the city of Sremska Mitrovica, Serbia. The airport is also known as Veliki Radinci Airport ( / ).

Airport is operated by flight club "Sremska Mitrovica". Main operations on the airport are soaring, gliding and sport, general and ultralight flying. At Sremska Mitrovica Airport is the only operating TOST winch which is used for gliding operations all around the year giving all interested pilots opportunity to fly at low cost.

Flight club is investing in infrastructure around the airport to give better conditions for visiting pilots. Housing and ground entertainment is under construction.

See also
Sremska Mitrovica
List of airports in Serbia

External links 
Sremska Mitrovica airport information (PDF)

Airports in Serbia
Buildings and structures in Vojvodina
Buildings and structures in Sremska Mitrovica